One Hundred Days After Childhood is a 1975 Soviet romance film directed by Sergei Solovyov. It was entered in the 25th Berlin International Film Festival where Solovyov won the Silver Bear for Best Director.

Plot
Pioneer leader Serge, a sculptor, decides to work in a new plastic material, among creatively gifted children in a camp located in an old mansion. Pioneer Lopukhin is so in love with his classmate Ergolina that he does not notice how fascinated Sonya Zagremukhina is with him. Showing their emotions and moods helps their participation in the production of the play "Masquerade" by Lermontov, and the play itself imperceptibly turns into a drama with unexpected confessions, insults, jealousy, and outbursts. The teens are so busy with their feelings that they do not pay attention to the pedagogical ideas of Pioneer Serge, and by the end of the film, with no additional encouragement, they are ready for a commemoration of first love.

Cast
 Boris Tokarev as Mitya Lopukhin
 Tatyana Drubich as Lena Ergolina
 Irina Malysheva as Sonya Zagremuhina
 Yuri Agilin as Gleb Lunyov
 Sergey Shakurov as Sergey Borisovitch
 Andrei Zvyagin as Sasha Lebedev
 Sergey Khlebnikov as Radist
 Nina Menshikova as Ksenia Lvovna
 Yuri Sorkin as Furikov
 Tatyana Yurinova as Zalikova
 Arina Alejnikova as Doctor

See also
 Could One Imagine?

References

External links

1975 films
1970s teen films
1975 romantic drama films
Soviet romantic drama films
Russian romantic drama films
1970s Russian-language films
Films directed by Sergei Solovyov